Kishon Philip (born 26 November 1999) is a Singaporean footballer currently playing as a defender for Hougang United.

Career statistics

Club

Notes

References

1999 births
Living people
Singaporean footballers
Association football defenders
Singapore Premier League players
Hougang United FC players